The Bahraini Super Cup is the curtain raiser to the Bahrain football season.

Previous winners
1995 : Al-MuharraqSC
2003 : Al-Ahli 2-1 Al-Muharraq SC
2004 : Al-Shabab 2-1 Busaiteen
2005 : Al-Muharraq SC 1-0 Al-Shabab
2006 : Al-Muharraq SC 3-2 Al-Najma
2007 : Al-Najma 3-2 Al-Riffa SC
2008 : Al-Najma 1-0 Busaiteen Club
2013 : Al-Muharraq SC 2-1 Busaiteen Club
2014 : East Riffa SCC 1-1 (6-5 penalty kicks) Al-Riffa SC
2015 : Hidd SCC 1-1 (6-5 penalty kicks) Al-Muharraq SC
2016 : Hidd SCC 1-0 Al-Muharraq SC
2017 : Manama SC 1-1 (4-2 penalty kicks) Malkiya SCC
2018 : Muharraq SC 2-2 (4-3 penalty kicks) Al-Najma SCC
2019 : Riffa SC 1-1 (5-3 penalty kicks) Manama SC
2020 : 
2021 : Riffa SC 1-1 (4-3 penalty kicks) East Riffa SCC
2022 : Al-Khaldiya SC 2-0 Riffa SC

Top-Performing Clubs

References
 Bahrain - List of Cup Winners (RSSSF)

Super
National association football supercups